Myslejovice is a municipality and village in Prostějov District in the Olomouc Region of the Czech Republic. It has about 600 inhabitants.

Administrative parts
Villages of Kobylničky and Křenůvky are administrative parts of Myslejovice.

History
The first written mention of Myslejovice is from 1267.

References

Villages in Prostějov District